The 1950 Vanderbilt Commodores football team represented Vanderbilt University during the 1950 college football season. The team's head coach was Bill Edwards, who was in his second season as the Commodores' head coach.  
 
Members of the Southeastern Conference, the Commodores played their six home games at Dudley Field in Nashville, Tennessee.

Schedule

References

Vanderbilt
Vanderbilt Commodores football seasons
Vanderbilt Commodores football